Township of Cove Creek is one of 37 townships in Washington County, Arkansas, USA. As of the 2000 census, its total population was 683. Part of Devil's Den State Park is located in Cove Creek Township.

Geography
Cove Creek Township was created in 1842 from parts of Mountain Township. It gave part to Lee's Creek Township in 1880.

Cities, towns, villages
Strickler

Cemeteries
The township contains Dunkard, Liberty, Morrow, and Scott Cemeteries.

Major routes
 Arkansas Highway 170
 Arkansas Highway 265

References

 United States Census Bureau 2008 TIGER/Line Shapefiles
 United States National Atlas

External links
 US-Counties.com
 City-Data.com

Townships in Washington County, Arkansas
Populated places established in 1842
Townships in Arkansas